AG magazin is a Serbian magazine for architecture and construction, founded in 2001. The magazine was created for the purposes of revealing new information about world projects, new engineering achievements, trends in house building and environmental issues. It is based in Belgrade.

References

External links
AG magazin official website

Architecture magazines
Engineering magazines
Magazines established in 2001
Mass media in Belgrade
Magazines published in Serbia
Serbian-language magazines